HMS Alcantara can refer to either of two ocean liners which were used by the British Royal Navy (RN) in wartime, adopting the prefix "HMS" while in RN service:

  - launched in 1926 and served as an armed merchant cruiser and troopship during World War II. Scrapped in 1958.

Royal Navy ship names